Theophilus Biddulph (1612–1683) was an English MP.

Theophilus Biddulph may also refer to:

Sir Theophilus Biddulph, 3rd Baronet (1683–1743), of the Biddulph baronets
Sir Theophilus Biddulph, 4th Baronet (1720–1798), of the Biddulph baronets
Sir Theophilus Biddulph, 5th Baronet (1757–1841), of the Biddulph baronets
Sir Theophilus Biddulph, 6th Baronet (1785–1854), of the Biddulph baronets
Sir Theophilus Biddulph, 7th Baronet (1830–1883), of the Biddulph baronets
Sir Theophilus Biddulph, 8th Baronet (1874–1948), of the Biddulph baronets

See also
Biddulph (disambiguation)